Servet Tazegül ( (born 26 September 1988) is a world, Olympic and European champion Turkish taekwondo  practitioner of Azerbaijani origin competing in the featherweight division.

He competed in the men's 68 kg class at the 2008 Summer Olympics held in Beijing, China and won the bronze medal. Tazegül qualified for the 2012 Summer Olympics and went on to beat Iran's Mohammad Bagheri Motamed in the final, with a score of 6–5, winning the gold medal.

At the 2013 Mediterranean Games held in Mersin, Turkey, he won the bronze medal in the 68 kg event.

Recognition
A 2013-built, multi-purpose indoor arena in Mersin with 7,500 seating capacity is named in his honor.

References

External links
 

1988 births
Living people
Turkish male taekwondo practitioners
Olympic taekwondo practitioners of Turkey
Olympic medalists in taekwondo
Olympic gold medalists for Turkey
Olympic bronze medalists for Turkey
Medalists at the 2008 Summer Olympics
Medalists at the 2012 Summer Olympics
Taekwondo practitioners at the 2008 Summer Olympics
Taekwondo practitioners at the 2012 Summer Olympics
Taekwondo practitioners at the 2016 Summer Olympics
World Taekwondo Championships medalists
European Taekwondo Championships medalists
European champions for Turkey
European Games competitors for Turkey
Taekwondo practitioners at the 2015 European Games
Mediterranean Games bronze medalists for Turkey
Mediterranean Games medalists in taekwondo
Competitors at the 2013 Mediterranean Games
Sportspeople from Nuremberg
Turkish people of Azerbaijani descent
21st-century Turkish people